Qarabağlı or Kalabegla or Kalabegli or Kalabekly meaning from Qarabağ may refer to:

Qarabağlı, Agsu, Azerbaijan
Qarabağlı, Khachmaz, Azerbaijan
Qarabağlı, Salyan, Azerbaijan
Qarabağlı, Samukh, Azerbaijan
Qarabağlı, Şabran, Azerbaijan

See also
Qarabağ (disambiguation)
Qarabağlar (disambiguation)
Qarabağ, Agdam, Azerbaijan